Denis Browne Gold Medal is a medal that was first struck in 1968, one year after the death of the paediatric surgeon Denis Browne and is awarded for outstanding contributions to paediatric surgery worldwide and is an honour bestowed by The British Association of Paediatric Surgeons.

Recipients

References

Awards established in 1968
British science and technology awards
Medicine awards
Paediatrics in the United Kingdom